Utajärvi is a municipality of Finland. It is located in the Northern Ostrobothnia region next to the border of the Kainuu region, and is part of the former province of Oulu. The municipality has a population of 
which 
is water. The population density is
. The municipality is unilingually Finnish.

The municipality is probably best known for the moraine region of Rokua, which is a popular summer and sports resort.

The popular rockgroup 22-Pistepirkko was formed in Utajärvi in 1980.

See also
 Finnish national road 22

References

External links

Municipality of Utajärvi – Official website